Green Ways is a set of three short atmospheric piano works composed by John Ireland in 1937, the individual titles are The Cherry Tree, Cypress and The Palm and May. They were written when the composer was 57, and are among the last pieces he wrote for piano.

Green Ways sets out to depict in music quotations from A. E. Housman (with whom he had a close affinity), William Shakespeare and Thomas Nashe and is full of typical Ireland lyricism and flowing harmonies.

The Cherry Tree

The Cherry Tree is prefixed with the last stanza from Loveliest of Trees, the second poem in the collection A Shropshire Lad (1896) by A. E. Housman: And since to look at things in bloom
 Fifty springs are little room,
 About the woodlands I will go
 To see the cherry hung with snow.

The piece is very rich in colour and tone and is in a very resonant D major all the way through, except for the central section that is not key-signatured. The tempo marking is  = 120, though it is common practice to slow this down to 104108, allowing a more comfortable ride but losing none of the richness.

The notes lie comfortably under the hands (a common characteristic with much of Ireland's piano works - for example, his Piano Concerto in E-flat major is an ideal work for the gifted pianist with smaller hands) once one becomes used to the colourful harmonies.

This is a popular piece among pianists due to the opportunities to show a personal response to the music. Good legato fingering and confident flutter pedalling is required to bring out the tones, and a good balance between the voices must be adhered to.

The piece carries a dedication to Herbert S. Brown and appeared in the 1999-2000 Associated Board Grade 8 syllabus for the piano.

Cypress 

Cypress is prefixed with the following line from Twelfth Night by William Shakespeare, sung by the Clown in Duke Orsino's palace (Act II, Scene IV): Come away, come away, death,
 And in sad cypress let me be laid.

The main motif for this work is the soft mournful notes in the left hand and the start and the end. Over this, a light chanting can be heard that is reminiscent of a funeral song or lament. The piece reaches a climax in the middle with rising and descending chromatics played between a series a dissonant chords. The ending recapitulates on the opening section and draws the death song to a close.

The bleakness inherent in the piece is compounded by a 5/4 time signature at an Andante mesto pace throughout, which never allows the listener to feel any regular rhythm or comfort. The key is a very melancholic F minor, though the cadences and chord progressions employed by Ireland are never finished and are constantly left hanging, even on the final chord.

This piece carries a dedication to Alfred Chenhalls.

The Palm and May 

The Palm and May is prefixed with the fifth line from Spring, the Sweet Spring, a poem from Thomas Nashe's poem cycle Summer's Last Will and Testament: The Palm and May make country houses gay.

This piece, in contrast to the preceding one, is full of mirth and gaiety. The fast tempo markings (Con moto;  = 6366) and 6/8 time signature conjure up an image of a country dance or jig. The left hand paints most of the colour in the opening section with constant falling and rising arpeggios, while the right hand introduces the first theme.

The E major start soon transposes into a section in A-flat major, where both hands bounce around with a dotted melody which is the second theme. This section turns slightly slower and less jolly with scales up and down in the right hand which rise and get quicker before a brillante slide down the keys leads neatly into a recapitulation of the first theme. The gaiety continues on into a final flourish at the end.

The piece carries a dedication to Harriet Cohen.

References

External links
 

Solo piano pieces by John Ireland
1937 compositions
Music with dedications